Jason Peninsula is a large peninsula on the east coast of Graham Land comprising several mainly snow-covered summits. This feature was first seen from seaward on December 1, 1893, by Carl Anton Larsen, who named one of the high peaks "Mount Jason" after his ship, the Jason. Larsen was too distant to map the area in detail, but in 1902 the Swedish Antarctic Expedition under Otto Nordenskiöld observed the area from Borchgrevink Nunatak and reported the peaks seen by Larsen to be separated from the mainland. The name "Jason Island" was subsequently used for Larsen's discovery, but in 1955 the Falkland Islands Dependencies Survey determined this feature to be a large peninsula.

See also 
 Argo Point
 Pelias Bluff

References

Further reading 
  David J. Cantrill, Imogen Poole, The Vegetation of Antarctica through Geological Time, P 178

External links 
 Jason Peninsula on USGS website
 Jason Peninsula on SCAR website
 Jason Peninsula area satellite image

Peninsulas of Graham Land
Oscar II Coast